Rozendal is a residential suburb of Stellenbosch since roughly the early 1970s. It forms the eastern border of the town together with Karindal. Stellenbosch is the second-oldest town in South Africa after Cape Town. The well-known Lanzerac Hotel and winery is a stones throw away and the road to Jonkershoek passes by the suburb.

References

Stellenbosch
Populated places in the Stellenbosch Local Municipality
1970s establishments in South Africa